The canton of Bagnères-de-Luchon is an administrative division of the Haute-Garonne department, southern France. Its borders were modified at the French canton reorganisation which came into effect in March 2015. Its seat is in Bagnères-de-Luchon.

It consists of the following communes:
 
Antichan-de-Frontignes
Antignac
Arbas
Arbon
Ardiège
Arguenos
Argut-Dessous
Arlos
Arnaud-Guilhem
Artigue
Aspet
Ausseing
Auzas
Bachos
Bagiry
Bagnères-de-Luchon
Barbazan
Baren
Beauchalot
Belbèze-en-Comminges
Benque-Dessous-et-Dessus
Bezins-Garraux
Billière
Binos
Bourg-d'Oueil
Boutx
Burgalays
Cabanac-Cazaux
Cassagne
Castagnède
Castelbiague
Castillon-de-Larboust
Castillon-de-Saint-Martory
Cathervielle
Caubous
Cazarilh-Laspènes
Cazaunous
Cazaux-Layrisse
Cazeaux-de-Larboust
Chaum
Chein-Dessus
Cier-de-Luchon
Cier-de-Rivière
Cierp-Gaud
Cirès
Couret
Encausse-les-Thermes
Escoulis
Estadens
Esténos
Eup
Figarol
Fos
Fougaron
Francazal
Le Fréchet
Fronsac
Frontignan-de-Comminges
Galié
Ganties
Garin
Génos
Gouaux-de-Larboust
Gouaux-de-Luchon
Gourdan-Polignan
Guran
Herran
His
Huos
Izaut-de-l'Hôtel
Jurvielle
Juzet-de-Luchon
Juzet-d'Izaut
Labroquère
Laffite-Toupière
Lège
Lestelle-de-Saint-Martory
Lourde
Luscan
Malvezie
Mancioux
Mane
Marignac
Marsoulas
Martres-de-Rivière
Mayrègne
Mazères-sur-Salat
Melles
Milhas
Moncaup
Mont-de-Galié
Montastruc-de-Salies
Montauban-de-Luchon
Montespan
Montgaillard-de-Salies
Montsaunès
Moustajon
Oô
Ore
Payssous
Pointis-de-Rivière
Portet-d'Aspet
Portet-de-Luchon
Poubeau
Proupiary
Razecueillé
Roquefort-sur-Garonne
Rouède
Saccourvielle
Saint-Aventin
Saint-Béat-Lez
Saint-Bertrand-de-Comminges
Saint-Mamet
Saint-Martory
Saint-Médard
Saint-Paul-d'Oueil
Saint-Pé-d'Ardet
Saleich
Salies-du-Salat
Salles-et-Pratviel
Sauveterre-de-Comminges
Seilhan
Sengouagnet
Sepx
Signac
Sode
Soueich
Touille
Trébons-de-Luchon
Urau
Valcabrère

References

Cantons of Haute-Garonne